Annette Werner (born 1966) is a German mathematician. Her research interests include diophantine geometry and the algebraic geometry of non-Archimedean ordered fields, including the study of buildings, Berkovich spaces, and tropical geometry. She is a professor of mathematics at Goethe University Frankfurt.

Education and career
Werner earned a diploma in mathematics from the University of Münster in 1991. She earned her Ph.D. at the same university in 1995, jointly supervised by Christopher Deninger and Siegfried Bosch; her dissertation was Local Heights on Uniformized Abelian Varieties and on Mumford Curves. She also completed her habilitation at Münster in 2000.

She worked as a postdoctoral researcher at the Max Planck Institute for Mathematics in Bonn in 1997–1998, and as an assistant at Münster from 1998 to 2003. She became a professor at the University of Siegen in 2004, but in the same year moved to the University of Stuttgart. She has been at the University of Frankfurt since 2007.

Book
Werner is the author of a German-language book on elliptic curve cryptography, Elliptische Kurven in der Kryptographie (Springer, 2002).

Recognition
Werner was Emmy Noether Lecturer of the German Mathematical Society in Munich in 2010.

References

1966 births
Living people
20th-century German mathematicians
German women mathematicians
University of Münster alumni
Academic staff of the University of Siegen
Academic staff of the University of Stuttgart
Academic staff of Goethe University Frankfurt
21st-century German mathematicians
20th-century German women
21st-century German women